The 2022 New Orleans Privateers baseball team represented the University of New Orleans during the 2022 NCAA Division I baseball season. The Privateers played their home games at Maestri Field at Privateer Park and were led by seventh–year head coach Blake Dean. They were members of the Southland Conference.

Preseason

Southland Conference Coaches Poll
The Southland Conference Coaches Poll was released on February 11, 2021, and the Privateers were picked to finish third in the conference with 73 votes.

Preseason All-Southland Team
The following players were named to the 2022 Preseason All-Southland Team, voted on by the league's coaches.

1st Team
Kasten Furr – Third Baseman
Pearce Howard – Outfielder
Caleb Seroski – Relief Pitcher

2nd Team
Anthony Herron Jr. – Designated Hitter

Personnel

Schedule and results

References

New Orleans Privateers
New Orleans Privateers baseball seasons
New Orleans Privateers baseball